Dame Bridget Margaret Ogilvie,    (born 24 March 1938) is an Australian and British scientist.

Education
Ogilvie was born in 1938 at Glen Innes, New South Wales, Australia, to John Mylne and Margaret Beryl (née McRae) Ogilvie. During her primary school years, she had a single teacher, and three other students in her class. 

She was educated at the New England Girls' School (Armidale, New South Wales), finishing in 1955. She completed a BRurSC (Hons I) degree in Rural Science at the University of New England, graduating with the university medal in 1960. She was awarded a Commonwealth Scholarship to attend Girton College, Cambridge, where she earned a PhD for her work on Nippostrongylus brasiliensis.

Career
Ogilvie joined the Parasitology department at the Medical Research Council's National Institute for Medical Research (NIMR) in 1963 and spent her academic career there studying immune responses to nematodes (intestinal worms) until 1981 when she was appointed to the staff of the Wellcome Trust, becoming its Director in 1991]. She remained as Director until she retired in 1998. The key event during her Directorship was the establishment of the Sanger Institute at Hinxton near Cambridge, now the Wellcome Genome Campus. 

At the end of her time at the Wellcome Trust, in 1998, she persuaded the government to join forces with the Wellcome Trust in funding the Joint Infrastructure Fund to improve university facilities for research.

She served on the main Board of Lloyds Bank, then Lloyds TSB bank. 1995–2000, and on the main Board of Zeneca, then AstraZeneca 1997–2006. She has many honorary degrees from universities in several countries and was the High Steward of the University of Cambridge from 2001 to 2009.

Ogilvie was the first Chairperson of the Medicines for Malaria Venture (MMV) Board. Since her retirement, she has played a significant role in public engagement with science and science in education. As a trustee of the Science Museum and chair of the AstraZeneca science teaching trust, she served as chair of COPUS and Techniquest. She has served as the Vice Chair of the Board of Trustees of Sense about Science since its establishment and is a Visiting Professor at University College London.

Awards and honours
In 1994, Ogilvie won the Kilgerran Prize of the Foundation for Science and Technology. In the 1996 New Year Honours List, Ogilvie was made a Dame Commander of the Order of the British Empire (DBE) and was elected a Fellow of the Royal Society (FRS) in 2003.

In 2007, she was appointed a Companion of the Order of Australia (AC), Australia's highest civilian honour, with the citation: "For service to science in the field of biomedical research, particularly related to veterinary and medical parasitology, and through support for research funding to improve global health."

She is a member of the Advisory Council for the Campaign for Science and Engineering. In 2008 she was elected to the Australian Academy of Science. She is an Honorary Fellow of St Edmund's College, Cambridge.
She is an honorary member of the British Society for Immunology.
In 2016 the Wellcome Sanger Institute named their new building after Bridget Ogilvie, dedicated for next generation sequencing operations.

References

|-

External links
MMV.org (Medicine for Malaria Venture)
Interview with Sense about Science

1938 births
Australian women scientists
British women scientists
Australian Dames Commander of the Order of the British Empire
Companions of the Order of Australia
Female Fellows of the Royal Society
Living people
Fellows of the Australian Academy of Science
Fellows of Girton College, Cambridge
National Institute for Medical Research faculty
Critics of alternative medicine
University of New England (Australia) alumni
Alumni of Girton College, Cambridge
Wellcome Trust
Academics of University College London
Fellows of the Royal Society